The Irish Squash Federation is the recognised governing body for the sport of Squash in Ireland and Northern Ireland.

External links
 Official site

See also
 Ireland men's national squash team
 Ireland women's national squash team
 Squash in Ireland

Squash
Squash in Ireland
1935 establishments in Ireland
National members of the World Squash Federation